The 1958 edition of the Campeonato Carioca kicked off on July 13, 1958 and ended on January 17, 1959. It was organized by FMF (Federação Metropolitana de Futebol, or Metropolitan Football Federation). Twelve teams participated. Vasco da Gama won the title for the 12th time. no teams were relegated.

System
The tournament would be disputed in a double round-robin format, with the team with the most points winning the title.

Championship

Playoffs
As stipulated in the regulations, in case of two teams or more tying in points, the teams in question would dispute a playoff. since Vasco da Gama, Botafogo and Flamengo ended up tied, the playoffs would be disputed as a single round-robin tournament, popularly known as the "Supercampeonato". However, at the end of the tournament, the three tied in points again, forcing another playoff, known as the "Supersupercampeonato", to be held, which was won by Vasco da Gama.

References

Campeonato Carioca seasons
Carioca